Sangita Patil is an Indian politician from the Bharatiya Janata Party and a Member of Legislative Assembly of Gujarat representing Limbayat constituency. She has been elected from the same constituency twice in 2012 and 2017.

Political career 
Patil is associated with the Bhartiya Janta Party. In 2012, Patil won the seat by defeating Congress' Suresh Sonavale by 30,321 votes. She was again elected from the same constituency in 2017.

Patil sought the imposition of 'Disturbed Areas Act' in her constituency which prevents the selling of property of one community member to another community member without prior permission of a collector. She has been accused of using a dummy candidate for her third year BA exam by a local Shiv Sena leader; she refuted the claim and filed a defamation case.

References 

Gujarat MLAs 2012–2017
Gujarat MLAs 2017–2022
People from Surat
Living people
Year of birth missing (living people)
Indian politicians